This is a list of bridges and viaducts in Bolivia, including those for pedestrians and vehicular traffic.

Historical and architectural interest bridges

Major road and railway bridges 
This table presents the structures with the greater spans (non-exhaustive list).

See also 

 Transport in Bolivia
 List of National Roads in Bolivia
 Rail transport in Bolivia
 Geography of Bolivia
 List of rivers of Bolivia

Notes and references 
 Notes

 

 Others references

External links 

 
 

Bolivia
 
Bridges
Bridges